Nascus paulliniae is a species of butterfly belonging to the family of skippers.

Appearance 
A medium-sized (wing span 40-50 millimeter), brown skipper with white cross bands on the forewings, and a white spot outside this.

Life cycle 
The larvae live on plants in the family Sapindaceae.

Distribution 
The species is found throughout Central and South America, from Mexico southwards to Brazil.

References 
 Brower, A.V.Z. and Warren, A. (2007) Pseudonascus at Tree of life 
 Markku Savela's Lepidoptera and some other life forms: Checklist of species. Hentet 1.6. 2012.

External links 
 Butterflies of America - Pseudonascus sp. 

Eudaminae
Hesperiidae of South America
Butterflies of Central America
Butterflies described in 1842